Stalingrad, a Soviet city and industrial centre on the river Volga, was bombed heavily by the Luftwaffe during the Battle of Stalingrad in World War II. German land forces comprising the 6th Army had advanced to the suburbs of Stalingrad by August 1942. The city was firebombed with 1,000 tons of high explosives and incendiaries in 1,600 sorties on 23 August. The destruction was monumental and complete, turning Stalingrad into a sea of fire and killing thousands of civilians and soldiers. Further fire-attacks were mounted against the ruined city for the next two days, enveloping it in dense volcano-like black smoke clouds that stretched 3.5 kilometers into the sky. At least 90% of the housing stock was obliterated.

In accordance with Adolf Hitler's demand to exterminate all traces of Soviet resistance, Soviet forces hiding in the rubble were subjected to nonstop German airstrikes until the Soviet counteroffensive in late November 1942. Luftflotte 4 flew 1,000 sorties per day on average from 23 August to 22 November, the bulk of which were directed at Stalingrad.

Background
Luftwaffe General Martin Fiebig's Fliegerkorps VIII was tasked in July 1942 with providing air support for the German 6th Army and 4th Panzer Army as they captured Stalingrad and secured the northern flank of the German advance to the Caucasus oilfields.

Fiebig's superior's, Generaloberst Wolfram von Richthofen’s Luftflotte 4 held a 1,600 kilometer eastern frontage in July and concentrated its efforts on Stalingrad, with the air support missions in the Caucasus under Kurt Pflugbeil's Fliegerkorps IV and at the Voronezh battle being given a lower priority. Logistics for Fliegerkorps VIII received the highest preference, as Richthofen saw the capture of Stalingrad as the key to German success on the entire Eastern Front. Richthofen requested additional Junkers Ju 52 transport groups from Oberkommando der Luftwaffe and transferred Pflugbeil's groups, as well as his road transport companies, to the administrative authority of a new, specially created, "Stalingrad transport region". He also ordered better procedures and greater efforts to maximize efficiency. His activities bore fruit as the Luftwaffe constantly lifted ammunition, provisions and fuel to the front. The army (Heer) implemented its own initiatives to increase supply effectiveness, the insufficient perfection of which had undermined the speed of the German advance since the beginning of Case Blue in June. By the third week of August, the 6th Army and Fliegerkorps VIII were receiving sufficient supplies to undertake without undue difficulties their primary mission of capturing Stalingrad.

Prelude
During the Battle of Kalach, Fliegerkorps VIII provided the German XIV and XXIV Panzer Corps' with decisive air support as the Soviet 62nd Army was encircled and destroyed west of Kalach from 8–11 August through the application of superior German firepower from all sides and especially from above. 50,000 prisoners were taken by the Germans, 1,100 Soviet tanks were destroyed or captured and the road to Stalingrad was laid bare.

LI Army Corps penetrated across the Don north of Kalach on 21 August, forcing the surprised and helpless Red Army formations to the south to fall back on Stalingrad. XIV Panzer Corps crossed the Don the next morning across two enormous pontoon bridges created by German engineers. Fiebig's air corps shot down 139 Red aircraft in three days and inflicted massive damage on Soviet ground forces. On 21 August Richthofen personally flew across the Don in his Fieseler Fi 156 and was shocked at the carnage of dead Soviet bodies and destroyed tanks. Hours after Richthofen's sightseeing, Kampfgeschwader 76'''s Junkers Ju 88 medium bombers exterminated two surprised Soviet reserve divisions on open fields 150 kilometers east of Stalingrad. Richthofen was excited and delighted by the one-sided massacre and wrote in his diary: "Blood flowed!"

Within two days of crossing the Don, Gustav Anton von Wietersheim's XIV Panzer Corps rolled forth to reach the Volga river at Spartanovka in the northern suburbs of Stalingrad at 1600 hours on 23 August. Stavka, the Soviet supreme command, was shocked by the speed of Wietersheim's advance. It was accomplished largely thanks to an overwhelming deluge of German airpower. Fliegerkorps VIII flew 1,600 unbroken sorties, blasting a path for the Panzer spearheads by dropping 1,000 tons of bombs on 23 August. Junkers Ju 87 Stuka dive bombers, Focke-Wulf Fw 190 ground attack aircraft and Heinkel He 111 and Junkers Ju 88 medium bombers bombed and strafed the paralyzed Soviets, landed, refueled, restocked their ordnance and flew more missions as the German aircraft never broke the cycle. Fliegerkorps VIII lost only three aircraft that day (against Soviet claims of 90), while destroying 91 Soviet aircraft in a single day and inflicting immeasurable damage on the Soviet soldiers and civilians on the ground.

The destruction of Stalingrad
It was only the first half of Fliegerkorps VIII's attacks that day as the second great air offensive of 23 August was carried out against the city of Stalingrad itself. From 3:18 pm on 23 August 1942 and through the night into 24 August units of Generaloberst von Richthofen’s Luftflotte 4 constantly attacked the city. Medium Bomber strength employed included elements of KG 27, KG 51, KG 55, KG 76, and I/KG 100.`

During 23 August Luftflotte 4 flew approximately 1,600 sorties and dropped 1,000 tons of bombs on the city effectively destroying it, while three aircraft were lost. 
Buildings crumbled under the blast effects of high explosives, while the extensive use of incendiaries torched factories, schools and houses. Wooden houses were immediately incinerated, leaving only their chimneys on the surface. In the first few hours of bombing, the headquarters of the city's air defenses were bombed. Stalingrad was enveloped in dense, volcano-like black clouds of smoke that stretched 3,500 meters into the sky. The destruction was monumental and complete as the entire city was put on fire and Soviet families either died or fled to ravines north of the city to escape the holocaust descending on their homes. Giant flames rose to the sky from massive destroyed oil storage containers and fuel tankers, which also spilled their contents of burning oil into the Volga, where it danced on the surface. The city was quickly turned to rubble, although some factories survived and continued production whilst workers militia joined in the fighting.

After 23 August, Stalingrad was bombed block-by-block for a further five days. According to official statistics the Soviet fighter defences of 8 VA and 102 IAD PVO claimed 90 German planes shot down, in addition to 30 by anti-aircraft defense. The Soviet Air Force in the immediate area lost 201 aircraft from 23–31 August, and despite meager reinforcements of some 100 aircraft in August, it had 192 serviceable aircraft, which included 57 fighters. The burden of the initial defense of the city fell on the 1077th Anti-Aircraft (AA) Regiment.

After another day of heavy bombing on 24 August, Richthofen on the morning of 25 August flew personally over the city to watch the "great fire-attack" of the day. He later wrote that the city was completely destroyed without any worthwhile further targets. In the evening, Soviet searchlights illuminated the sky as the city burned bright, spewing smoke and flames into the sky, a sight that Generalmajor Wolfgang Pickert, commander of the 9th Flak Division, described as "fantastic".

Stalin resisted the evacuation of civilians, in part due to the importance of the city's factories to the war effort. Initial Soviet reports stated the water supply and electricity grid as knocked out. On 26 August a detailed Soviet Urban Committee of Defence report gave the following casualty figures; 955 dead and 1,181 wounded. Due to the fighting that followed and the high death toll, it is impossible to know how many more were killed in aerial attacks. It is generally estimated that more than 40,000 people, mostly civilians, have lost their lives during the attack. As air-raid shelters in the city were extremely inadequate for the population of the Soviet metropolis and large portions of the suburban buildings were made of easily flammable wood, the death toll and destruction from the bombing was comparable to the British bombing of Darmstadt on 11/12 September 1944, when 900 tons of bombs from 226 Avro Lancaster heavy bombers killed 12,300 German citizens of the city.

Further operations

Wietersheim's isolated Panzer Corps was subjected to heavy Soviet counterattacks, which threatened to destroy it. Fliegerkorps VIII once again rescued its Heer comrades, launching nonstop attacks on the Red Army and stopping its attacks in their tracks. Richthofen, who was disgusted by the army's lack of aggressiveness, demanded an immediate, all-out attack to take the city. Hermann Hoth's 4th Panzer Army, immobilized for days far to the south of Stalingrad due to a lack of fuel, recommenced its offensive on 28 August with strong support from the Stukas and Fw 190s of Fliegerkorps VIII. Hoth's Panzer Divisions outflanked the Soviets on 29 August, who fell back on Stalingrad. On 30 August Richthofen, believing the fall of Stalingrad to be imminent, ordered fresh terror attacks on the city to break the Soviet will to resist. That day and the next, Fliegerkorps VIII launched full-scale bombing operations against the city, also attacking Soviet airfields east of the Volga to maintain German air superiority.Luftflotte 4 defeated the VVS in the airspace above the city, restricting the Soviets to night operations. The Germans obtained daylight air superiority over the Stalingrad area and exploited their edge to devastating effect. From 5 to 12 September, Luftflotte 4 conducted 7,507 sorties (938 per day). From 16 to 25 September, it carried out 9,746 sorties (975 per day). On 14 October it launched 1,250 sorties against Soviet positions west and east of the Volga and Soviet traffic along the river. That same day, its three Stuka Geschwader'' mounted 320 sorties against the Soviet positions on the west bank, dropping 540 tons of bombs on them.

Over the course of the battle through to late 1942, the Germans flew 70,000 sorties dropping over a million bombs.

References
Citations

Bibliography

Battle of Stalingrad
World War II aerial operations and battles of the Eastern Front